Allen Creek is a stream in the municipality of Dysart et al, Haliburton County in Central Ontario, Canada. It is a tributary of Benoir Lake and is in the Ottawa River drainage basin.

Course
It flows north to the southwest end of Allen Lake, then exits the lake at the north continuing briefly north. It then turns east, takes in the right tributary Straggle Creek and reaches the west end of Fishtail Lake. Benoir Lake flows via the York River and the Madawaska River to the Ottawa River.

References

Rivers of Haliburton County